Lowen Kruse (February 25, 1929 – November 24, 2017) was a politician from the U.S. state of Nebraska.  From 2001 to 2009, he represented the 13th District, consisting of part of Omaha, Nebraska, in the Nebraska Legislature.  Kruse was a minister for the United Methodist Church in the Nebraska Conference from 1956 until 1994. He was married to Ruth (Wallis) Kruse for 61 years, from 1956 until his death.

Kruse was born in 1929, in Boelus, Nebraska, and graduated from Boelus High School, Nebraska Wesleyan University, and Garrett Theological Seminary at Northwestern University with a master's degree. In addition to serving as a United Methodist minister in Omaha, Kruse was also a pastor in other Nebraska counties and held other positions in the church.  He published three works: Paradise on the Prairie, We Are the Church, and Omaha: The Prairie Blossoms.

In 2000, Kruse was elected to represent the 13th Nebraska legislative district.  He was reelected in 2004. In the Legislature, he served as vice chairperson of the Appropriations Committee.

Kruse died on November 24, 2017, at the age of 88.

See also
North Omaha

References

 
 

1929 births
2017 deaths
Politicians from Omaha, Nebraska
Democratic Party Nebraska state senators
Nebraska Wesleyan University alumni
Christianity in Omaha, Nebraska
Garrett–Evangelical Theological Seminary alumni
Religious leaders from Nebraska
American United Methodist clergy